Stigmella potgieteri is a moth of the family Nepticulidae. It was described by Scoble in 1978. It is found in South Africa (it was described from the Kruger National Park).

References

Nepticulidae
Moths described in 1978
Endemic moths of South Africa